The Finnish Kuopio Battalion is responsible for training of a reconnaissance and ranger unit and a maintenance unit of the Kainuu Brigade. About 250 to 300 conscripts and 160 salaried professionals work in the battalion.

Logistics Company

The logistics company trains specialists for the supplies and transportation. It also leads the courses for the special maintenance personnel, logistics platoon leader and war-time unit officer courses in cooperation with other logistics units.

The logistics company consists of
supply and transport platoon
maintenance platoon
first medical aid platoon
logistics service platoon
command post platoon

1st Separate vehicle company

The privates and those to be promoted as lance-corporals will achieve BECE driver licence for heavy vehicles and the NCO course attendants BC driving licence. All those, who will graduate from the courses will get a certificate for 140 hours or 280 hours of civilian professional training.

Maintenance center

The maintenance center is responsible of peace-time training and storing war-time materials according to the instruction of the Kainuu Brigade and the Northern Finland Logistics Regiment. It also support the troops production. The maintenance center has the leading unit, vehicle department, repair department, systems department and office.

Transport Center

The transport center plans and leads the conscript driver training, the salaried personnel training and executed the special courses of the transport section. It also support the troop production of the battalions or units of that level. The transport center has three units: transport office, transport department and driver training center.

Material Center
 
The material center stores, maintains, adds, evacuates and supplies the gun, electronic and economic materials and takes part in the crises time planning for diversifying the material storages. It takes part in troops production. The units of the material center are battle material, electronics and food supplies storage.

Kainuu Brigade